North Karachi or New Karachi is a town in Karachi, Sindh, Pakistan. North Karachi is located between the Lyari River, the Manghopir Hills and two major roads - Surjani Road to the north and Shahrah-e-Zahid Hussain to the south. To the north and west lies Gadap Town, and to the south lie the towns of Gulberg and North Nazimabad. The population of North Karachi Town was estimated to be about 500,000 at the 1998 census. In 2005, the projected  population crossed the 1 million count.  There are several ethnic groups including Muhajirs, Punjabis, Sindhis, Kashmiris, Seraikis, Pakhtuns, Balochis, Memons, Bohras, Ismailis, etc.

Administratively, North Karachi comes under district 'Central' of Karachi.

References

External links 
 Official Karachi Website

Neighbourhoods of Karachi
North Nazimabad Town